Gran valor en la facultad de medicine is a 1981 Argentine film directed by Enrique Cahen Salaberry.

External links

1981 films
Argentine comedy films
Films directed by Enrique Cahen Salaberry